Audrey Hepburn (4 May 1929 – 20 January 1993) was a British actress who had an extensive career in film, television, and on the stage from 1948 to 1993. Considered by some to be one of the most beautiful women of all time, she was ranked as the third greatest screen legend in American cinema by the American Film Institute. Hepburn is also remembered as both a film and style icon. Her debut was as a flight stewardess in the 1948 Dutch film Dutch in Seven Lessons. Hepburn then performed on the British stage as a chorus girl in the musicals High Button Shoes (1948), and Sauce Tartare (1949). Two years later she made her Broadway debut as the title character in the play Gigi. Hepburn's Hollywood debut as a runaway princess in William Wyler's Roman Holiday (1953) opposite Gregory Peck made her a star. For her performance she received the Academy Award for Best Actress, the BAFTA Award for Best British Actress, and the Golden Globe Award for Best Actress in a Motion Picture – Drama. In 1954 she played a chauffeur's daughter caught in a love triangle in Billy Wilder's romantic comedy Sabrina opposite Humphrey Bogart and William Holden. In the same year Hepburn garnered the Tony Award for Best Actress in a Play for portraying the titular water nymph in the play Ondine.

Her next role was as Natasha Rostova in the 1956 film adaptation of Leo Tolstoy's War and Peace. In 1957 Hepburn starred with Fred Astaire in the musical film Funny Face, and with Gary Cooper and Maurice Chevalier in Billy Wilder's Love in the Afternoon. Two years later she appeared in the romantic adventure film Green Mansions, and played a nun in The Nun's Story. In 1961, Hepburn played café society girl Holly Golightly in the romantic comedy Breakfast at Tiffany's, and as a teacher accused of lesbianism in Wyler's drama The Children's Hour opposite Shirley MacLaine. Two years later she appeared opposite Cary Grant in the romantic mystery film Charade. Hepburn followed this by starring in the romantic comedy Paris When It Sizzles opposite William Holden, and as Cockney flower girl Eliza Doolittle in the musical film My Fair Lady (both in 1964). In 1967, she played a blind woman menaced by drug dealers in her own home in the suspense thriller Wait Until Dark which earned her a Best Actress Oscar nomination. Nine years later, Hepburn played Maid Marian opposite Sean Connery as Robin Hood in Robin and Marian.

Her final film appearance was a cameo as an angel in Steven Spielberg's Always (1989). Hepburn's final screen role was as the host of the television documentary series Gardens of the World with Audrey Hepburn (1993) for which she posthumously received the Primetime Emmy Award for Outstanding Individual Achievement – Informational Programming. In recognition of her career, Hepburn earned the Special Award from BAFTA, the Golden Globe Cecil B. DeMille Award, the Screen Actors Guild Life Achievement Award, and the Special Tony Award.

Film

Television

Stage

See also
List of EGOT winners
List of Presidential Medal of Freedom recipients

References

Bibliography

External links
 

Actress filmographies
British filmographies
Audrey Hepburn